The 2006–07 Israel State Cup (Gvia HaMedina) was the 68th season of Israel's nationwide football cup competition and the 53rd after the Israeli Declaration of Independence.

The competition was won by Hapoel Tel Aviv, who have beaten Hapoel Ashkelon on penalties at the final. By winning, Hapoel Tel Aviv qualified to the second round of the UEFA Cup.

Results

Eighth Round

Ninth Round

Round of 16

Quarter-finals

Semi-finals

Final

References
Israel State Cup 2006–07, Israeli Football Association.
Israel Cup 2006/07 RSSSF

Israel State Cup
State Cup
Israel State Cup seasons